VDK may refer to:

Sport
VDK Gent Dames, Belgian women's volleyball team
VDK Gent in Liga A in Belgium Men's Volleyball League
VDK Gent Heren in Liga B in Belgium Men's Volleyball League

Other uses
Volksbund Deutsche Kriegsgräberfürsorge, abbreviation VDK, German War Graves Commission
VDK Spaarbank, Belgian bank